Drosera zigzagia is an erect perennial tuberous species in the carnivorous plant genus Drosera. It is endemic to Western Australia and is found on the margins of salt lakes in brown sandy loam, often associated with D. salina, Stylidium insensitivum, S. pulviniforme, Levenhookia leptantha, and Frankenia species. Yellow flowers are borne on 4–9-flowered inflorescences that bloom from August to September.

Drosera zigzagia was first described by Allen Lowrie in 1999.

See also
List of Drosera species

References

Carnivorous plants of Australia
Caryophyllales of Australia
Eudicots of Western Australia
Plants described in 1999
zigzagia